This is a list of Provincial Poets Laureate in Canada. Currently, only the provinces of Ontario, Prince Edward Island, Saskatchewan and Yukon have appointed a poet laureate.

Ontario

In 2021 Ontario named its first poet laureate Randell Adjei.

Prince Edward Island
Prince Edward Island appointed its first poet laureate, John Smith, in 2003. 

 Julie Pellissier-Lush (2019-present)
 Deirdre Kessler (2016-2019)
 Diane Hicks Morrow (2013-2016)
 Hugh MacDonald (2009-2013)
 David Helwig (2008-2009)
 Frank Ledwell (2004-2007)
 John Smith (2002-2004)

Saskatchewan
Saskatchewan appointed its first poet laureate, Glen Sorestad, in 2000. 

 Carol Rose GoldenEagle (2021 - present) 
 Bruce Rice (2019 - 2021)
 Brenda Schmidt (2017 - 2018)
 Gerry Hill (2016 - 2017)
 Judith Krause (2014 - 2015) 
 Don Kerr (2011 - 2013)
 Robert Currie (2007 - 2010) 
 Louise B. Halfe (Sky Dancer) (2005 - 2006) 
 Glen Sorestad (2000 - 2004)

Yukon
Inaugural Yukon Provincial Poet Laureate PJ Yukon has held the office since 1994.

See also

 Poet Laureate of Toronto
 Canadian Parliamentary Poet Laureate
 Municipal Poets Laureate in Alberta, Canada
 Municipal Poets Laureate in British Columbia, Canada
 Municipal Poets Laureate in Ontario, Canada

References

Poets Laureate of places in Canada